Richard Sidney Sayers (11 July 1908, Bury St Edmunds — 25 February 1989, Eastbourne) was a British economist and historian specialized in the history of banking. He played an important role with regard to the development of monetary economics and the direction of British central banking.

Early years and education 
Richard Sidney Sayers was born as the fifth in a family of seven to Sidney James Sayers, an accountant for West Suffolk's county council, and Caroline Mary Watson. Sayers attended various schools in Bury St Edmunds from 1912 to 1926 and became head prefect in his last two years at West Suffolk County School. In 1926, he entered St Catharine's College at Cambridge University and took first classes in both parts of the economics tripos. At Cambridge and later in life, Sayers was a friend of John Maynard Keynes, whose Political Economy Club Sayers was a member of, as well as a friend of Dennis Robertson, to whom he often sent drafts prior to publication. Sayers married Millicent Hodson, an old classmate of his and the daughter of William Henry John Hodson, a brewery bookkeeper, in 1930. Unfortunately and in spite of two children, the marriage wasn't happy.

Career 
Sayers was appointed as assistant lecturer at the London School of Economics (LSE) in 1931 after completing his postgraduate studies at Cambridge University. He remained at LSE until 1935, when he became a lecturer at Oxford University, being made a fellow of Pembroke College in 1939. In 1936 Sayers published Bank of England Operations, 1890-1914, in which he studied the activities of England's central bank in the Edwardian era. Needing money in light of his growing family, Sayers published Modern Banking, his internationally known textbook on banking, in 1938, throughout which he emphasized the importance of liquidity, his scepticism regarding the effectiveness and manageability of the bank rate, and his reservations concerning unsupported monetary policy.

During World War II, Sayers worked in the Ministry of Supply, where he was involved in negotiations for the development of uranium supplies, a topic related to the construction of the nuclear bomb. In 1945, James Meade convinced Sayers to accept the position of deputy director of the Economic Section of the Cabinet Office. Sayers and Meade, by then the section's director, both moved from the Cabinet Office back to academia in 1947, where Sayers accepted the Sir Ernest Cassel Chair of Economics at the LSE. He remained there until his early retirement in 1968, 21 years later.

Throughout the 1950s, Sayers produced or edited six books, including Financial Policy, 1939-45 and his history of Lloyd Banks. Financial Policy, which was published in 1956 and took Sayers five years to complete, gave a gripping yet truthful account of the wartime Treasury and the economic and political challenges it had to deal at that time. A testament to Sayers' skill as a historian and writer, the book became part of the official war history. which became part of the official war history and on which he worked for more than five years. In 1957 Sayers was appointed to the Committee on the Working of the Monetary System, where he examined most witnesses and drafted key section of the committee's official report. However, Sayers grew to be bitterly disappointed with the report's reception after it was published in 1959. 

This disappointment notwithstanding, Sayers went on to publish dozens of essays, articles and books in the following three decades, and was very often requested as a historian of financial institution. In this context, he was considered as a possible historian of the U.S. federal reserve system and wrote a post-1914 sequel to the official history of the Bank of England. This history was completed in 1976 and earned Sayers the offer of a knighthood, which he refused.

In addition to his academic work, Sayers was an editorial adviser of the Three Banks Review in 1948-1968 and closely associated with the editing of Economica. Moreover, he was made a fellow of the British Academy in 1957 and held its vice presidency in 1966-67, whereafter he worked from 1969 to 1974 as its publications secretary.

Personal life
After many years of unhappy marriage, Sayers at last left his wife in 1985 and further lived with Audrey Taylor, an old associate of his.

Sources 
 Cairncross, A. (1990). Richard Sidney Sayers, 1908-1989, ''Proceedings of the British Academy, 76, pp. 545–561.
 Cairncross, A. (2004). Richard Sidney Sayers, 1909-1989, in: Goldman, L. (ed.). Oxford Dictionary of National Biography. Oxford (UK): Oxford University Press.

References

1908 births
1989 deaths
British economists
Alumni of the University of Cambridge
20th-century English historians